Walter Znenahlik (born 2 January 1935) is an Austrian ice hockey player. He competed in the men's tournaments at the 1956 Winter Olympics and the 1964 Winter Olympics.

References

1935 births
Living people
Olympic ice hockey players of Austria
Ice hockey players at the 1956 Winter Olympics
Ice hockey players at the 1964 Winter Olympics
Ice hockey people from Vienna